Thomas Clinton "Potsy" Jones (October 15, 1909 – July 3, 1990) was an American football player who played offensive lineman for eight seasons for the Minneapolis Red Jackets, Frankford Yellow Jackets, New York Giants, and Green Bay Packers.

References

External links

1909 births
1990 deaths
American football offensive linemen
Bucknell Bison football players
Frankford Yellow Jackets players
Green Bay Packers players
Minneapolis Red Jackets players
New York Giants players
People from Schuylkill County, Pennsylvania
Players of American football from Pennsylvania
Wilmington Clippers players